Louis Edward Green (born September 23, 1979) is a former American football player. Green attended Jefferson County High School in Fayette, Mississippi and was a letterman in football. A linebacker who played for the Denver Broncos, he previously went to Alcorn State University.

On February 19, 2007, the Broncos resigned Green to a 3-year, $2.5 million contract with a $300,000 signing bonus.

On June 16, 2009, he was released.

References

External links 
Denver Broncos bio

1979 births
Living people
American football linebackers
Alcorn State Braves football players
Amsterdam Admirals players
Denver Broncos players
People from Vicksburg, Mississippi
Ed Block Courage Award recipients